Santiago de la Puebla is a village and municipality in the province of Salamanca,  western Spain, part of the autonomous community of Castile-Leon. It is located 54 kilometres from the provincial capital city of Salamanca and has a population of 417 people.

Geography
The municipality covers an area of 53 km².  It lies 824 metres above sea level.

Economy
The economy is based primarily on agriculture and olive growing.

See also
List of municipalities in Salamanca

External links
Santiago de la Puebla official website
Santiago de la Puebla unofficial website
Santiago de la Puebla personal website

References

Municipalities in the Province of Salamanca